The 2017 Catalan motorcycle Grand Prix was the seventh round of the 2017 MotoGP season. It was held at the Circuit de Barcelona-Catalunya in Montmeló on June 11, 2017.

Classification

MotoGP

 Bradley Smith withdrew from the event after suffering a hand injury in a crash during free practice.

Moto2

Moto3

Championship standings after the race

MotoGP
Below are the standings for the top five riders and constructors after round seven has concluded.

Riders' Championship standings

Constructors' Championship standings

 Note: Only the top five positions are included for both sets of standings.

Moto2

Moto3

Notes

References

Catalan
Catalan Motorcycle Grand Prix
motorcycle
Catalan motorcycle Grand Prix
Catalan